This is a list of major music awards received by Reba McEntire, an American country music singer, who is often referred to as "The Queen of Country Music". A three-time Grammy Award winner, she also holds several awards from the Academy of Country Music and Country Music Association, the two major country music award associations. McEntire has won at least one award every year from 1984 to present. She has won 85 awards.

American Country Awards
Fox broadcast the American Country Awards from 2010–2013, the award show was fan-voted, and McEntire garnered 6 nominations.

|-
|rowspan=4 |2010 
| Herself 
| Female Artist of the Year 
|
|-
|rowspan=2|"Consider Me Gone" 
|Single by a Female Artist 
| 
|-
| Music Video by a Female Artist 
| 
|-
|Herself (and George Strait) 
| Touring Artist of the Year 
|
|-
|rowspan=2|2011 
|rowspan=2| "Turn On The Radio" 
| Single of the Year: Female 
| 
|-
| Music Video: Female 
|

Academy of Country Music Awards
The Academy of Country Music Awards is an annual country music awards show, established in 1964. Reba has won 14 regular ACM awards and 5 ACM Special Achievement awards for a total of 19 ACM Awards. Reba holds the record for most ACM nominations for a female artist with 48. Note: The year of the nomination/win is for the previous calendar year (for example: Reba's win for Female Vocalist of the Year and Entertainer of the Year was presented in 1995 but awarded for 1994). 
|-
| 1980 || rowspan=5|Herself || rowspan=5|Top New Female Vocalist || 
|-
| 1983 || 
|-
| 1984 || 
|-
| 1985 || 
|-
| 1986 || 
|-
| 1986 ||rowspan=4| "Whoever's in New England" || Country Music Video of the Year || 
|-
| 1986 || Song of the Year || 
|-
| 1986 || Single of the Year –Producer || 
|-
| 1986 || Single of the Year – Artist || 
|-
| 1986 || rowspan=4|Herself || Entertainer of the Year || 
|-
| 1987 || Top Female Vocalist || 
|-
| 1987 || Entertainer of the Year || 
|-
| 1988 || Top Female Vocalist of the Year || 
|-
| 1988 || "I Know How He Feels" || Song of the Year || 
|-
| 1988 || "Sunday Kind of Love" || Video of the Year - Artist || 
|-
| 1988 || rowspan=2|Herself || Entertainer of the Year || 
|-
| 1989 || Top Female Vocalist || 
|-
| 1989 || "Cathy's Clown" || Country Video of the Year || 
|-
| 1990 || Herself || Top Female Vocalist || 
|-
| 1990 || Herself & Vince Gill || Top Vocal Duet || 
|-
| 1990 || rowspan=3|Herself || Entertainer of the Year || 
|-
| 1991 || Entertainer of the Year || 
|-
| 1991 || Top Female Vocalist || 
|-
| 1991 || "Is There Life Out There" || Video of the Year || 
|-
| 1992 || "The Night the Lights Went Out In Georgia" || Video of the Year|| 
|-
| 1992 || "Take It Back" || Video of the Year || 
|-
| 1992 || Herself || Entertainer of the Year || 
|-
| 1993 || "Does He Love You" || Video of the Year || 
|-
| 1993 || Herself & Linda Davis || Top Vocal Duet || 
|-
| 1993 || rowspan=3|"Does He Love You" || Song of the Year || 
|-
| 1993 || Single Record of the Year - Artist || 
|-
| 1993 || Single Record of the Year - Producer || 
|-
| 1993 || rowspan=8|Herself || Top Female Vocalist || 
|-
| 1993 || Entertainer of the Year || 
|-
| 1994 || Top Female Vocalist || 
|-
| 1994 || Entertainer of the Year || 
|-
| 1995 ||Top Female Vocalist || 
|-
| 1995 || Entertainer of the Year || 
|-
| 1996 || Top Female Vocalist of the Year || 
|-
| 1997 || Entertainer of the Year || 
|-
| 1999 || Herself and Brooks & Dunn || Vocal Event of the Year || 
|-
| 2002 || Herself || Home Depot Humanitarian Award || 
|-
| 2003 || rowspan=2|Herself || Leading Lady Award || 
|-
| 2005 || Special Award for Most Female Vocalist Wins || 
|-
| 2007 || rowspan=2| "Because of You" (with Kelly Clarkson) || Vocal Event of The Year || 
|-
| 2007 || Vocal Event of the Year - Producer || 
|-
| 2008 || Herself and Brooks & Dunn || Vocal Event of the Year || 
|-
| 2009 || rowspan=4|Herself || Top Female Vocalist of the Year || 
|-
| 2010 || Top Female Vocalist || 
|-
| 2010 || Career Achievement Award || 
|-
| 2015 || 50th Anniversary Milestone Award || 
|-
| 2016 || "Forever Country" || Video of the Year - Artist || 
|-
| 2017 || rowspan=2|Herself ||  Mae Boren Axton Award || 
|-
| 2018 || Female Vocalist of the Year || 
|-
| 2021 || "Be A Light" || Music Event of the Year - Artist ||

American Music Awards
The American Music Awards is an annual major American music award show by the American Broadcasting Company. It was established in 1973. Reba has won 14 American music awards, and holds the record for "Favorite Country Female Artist" wins with ten.

|-
| 1987
| Herself
| Favorite Country Female Artist
| 
|-
| 1987
| Whoever's In New England
| Favorite Country Album
| 
|-
| 1987
| "Whoever's In New England"
| Favorite Country Female Video Artist
| 
|-
| 1988
| "Whoever's In New England"
| Favorite Country Video
| 
|-
| 1988
| Herself
| Favorite Country Female Artist
| 
|-
| 1988
| "What Am I Going to Do About You"
| Favorite Country Video
| 
|-
| 1989
| Herself
| Favorite Country Female Artist
| 
|-
| 1990
| Herself
| Favorite Country Female Artist
| 
|-
| 1991
| Herself
| Favorite Country Female Artist
| 
|-
| 1991
| Reba Live
| Favorite Country Album
| 
|-
| 1992
| Herself
| Favorite Country Female Artist
| 
|-
|-
| 1993
| Herself
| Favorite Country Female Artist
| 
|-
| 1993
| For My Broken Heart
| Favorite Country Album
| 
|-
| 1994
| Herself
| Favorite Country Female Artist
| 
|-
| 1994
| It's your Call
| Favorite Country Album
| 
|-
| 1995
| Herself
| Favorite Country Female Artist
| 
|-
| 1995
| Read My Mind
| Favorite Country Album
| 
|-
| 1996
| Herself
| Favorite Country Female Artist
| 
|-
|-
| 1998
| Herself
| Favorite Country Female Artist
| 
|-
| 2001
| Herself
| Favorite Country Female Artist
| 
|-
| 2004
| Herself
| Favorite Country Female Artist
| 
|-
| 2008
| Herself
| Favorite Country Female Artist
| 
|-
| 2009
| Herself
| Favorite Country Female Artist
|

Billboard Music Awards
Billboard Music Awards are annual awards based on album and digital songs sales, streaming, radio airplay, touring and social engagement. Reba McEntire has won three awards.

|-
| 1994
| rowspan=3|Herself
| Favorite Female Country Artist
| 
|-
| 1997
| Favorite Female Country Artist
| 
|-
| 2007
| Woman Of The Year 
|

Blockbuster Entertainment Awards
The Blockbuster Entertainment Awards was an annual awards show held from 1995–2001. Reba McEntire won two out of three nominations.

|-
| 1995 
| Herself
| Favorite Female Country Artist
| 
|-
| 1997
| What If It's You
| Favorite Album by a Female Country Artist
| 
|-
| 2001
| Herself
| Favorite Female Artist — Country
|

British Country Music Awards
The British Country Music Association holds annual awards to honor the best in country music. Reba McEntire has won two awards.

|-
| 1999 
| rowspan=2|Herself 
| rowspan=2|International Female Vocalist 
| 
|-
| 2000 
|
|-

Canadian Country Music Awards
The Canadian Country Music Association holds annual awards to honor the best in Country Music. Reba McEntire has been nominated once.

|-
| 2007|| Reba Duets  || Top Selling Album  || 
|-

CMT Music Awards
The CMT Music Awards is a fan-voted awards show for country music videos and television performances. Reba McEntire has received ten nominations. 

|-
|2006
|"You're Gonna Be"
|Most Inspiring Video of the Year
|
|-
|rowspan=2|2008
|"Because of You" (with Kelly Clarkson)
|Video of the Year 
|
|-
|"Because of You" (with Kelly Clarkson)
|Collaborative Video of the Year 
|
|-
|2009
|"Cowgirls Don’t Cry" (with Brooks & Dunn)
|Collaborative Video of the Year
|
|-
|rowspan=2|2010
|"Consider Me Gone"
|Female Video of the Year
|
|-
|"Consider Me Gone"
|CMT Performance of the Year
|
|-
|rowspan=2|2011
|"Turn On the Radio"
|Female Video of the Year
|
|-
|"If I Were a Boy"
|CMT Performance of the Year
|
|-
|2015
|"Going Out Like That"
|Female Video of the Year
|
|-
|2017
|"Back to God"
|Female Video of the Year
|

CMT Online Awards
CMT Online Awards is an annual online award show, established in 2006 by Country Music Television. This is a "fan-voted" award show, based on the fans going to CMT.com streaming the videos and viewing the artists' pages. The winner in each category received the highest numbers of streams and views on CMT.com.

|-
|2007||"Because of You" (with Kelly Clarkson) at Crossroads ||  No. 1 Streamed Live Performance || 
|-
|2008||"Because of You" (with Kelly Clarkson) || Video of the year || 
|-
|2008||"Because of You" (with Kelly Clarkson) || Tearjerker Video of the year || 
|-
|2010||"Consider Me Gone" || Performance of the Year || 
|-
|2010||"Consider Me Gone" || Female Video of the Year || 
|-
|2015||"Going Out Like That" || Female Video of the Year || 
|-

Country Music Association Awards
The Country Music Association Awards is an annual country music awards show, established in 1967. Reba has been nominated a total of 51 times. Reba has won 7 of those awards.

|-
|rowspan="2" | 1983 || Herself || Horizon Award || 
|-
| Herself || Female Vocalist of the Year || 
|-
| 1984 || Herself || Female Vocalist of the Year || 
|-
|rowspan="3" | 1985 || Herself || Female Vocalist of the Year || 
|-
| Herself || Entertainer of the Year || 
|-
| "My Kind of Country" || Album of the Year || 
|-
|rowspan="5" | 1986 || Whoever's in New England || Album of the Year || 
|-
| Herself || Female Vocalist of the Year || 
|-
| Herself || Entertainer of the Year || 
|-
| "Whoever's in New England" || Music Video of the Year || 
|-
| "Whoever's in New England" ||Single of the Year || 
|-
|rowspan="4" | 1987 || "| Herself || Female Vocalist of the Year || 
|-
| Herself || Entertainer of the Year || 
|-
| What Am I Gonna Do About You || Album of the Year || 
|-
| "What Am I Gonna Do About You" || Music Video of the Year || 
|-
|rowspan="2" | 1988 || "| Herself || Female Vocalist of the Year || 
|-
| Herself || Entertainer of the Year || 
|-
|rowspan="2" | 1989 || "| Herself || Female Vocalist of the Year || 
|-
| Herself || Entertainer of the Year || 
|-
|rowspan="2" | 1990 || "| Herself || Female Vocalist of the Year || 
|-
| "Oklahoma Swing" (with Vince Gill) || Vocal Event Of The Year || 
|-
|rowspan="4" | 1991 || "| Herself || Female Vocalist of the Year || 
|-
| Herself || Entertainer of the Year || 
|-
| "Rumor Has It" || Album of the Year || 
|-
| "Fancy" || Music Video of the Year || 
|-
|rowspan="4" | 1992 || "| Herself || Female Vocalist of the Year || 
|-
| Herself || Entertainer of the Year || 
|-
| For My Broken Heart || Album of the Year || 
|-
| "Is There Life Out There" || Music Video of the Year || 
|-
|rowspan="3" | 1993 || Herself || Female Vocalist of the Year || 
|-
| Herself || Entertainer of the Year || 
|-
| "The Heart Wont Lie" (with Vince Gill) || Vocal Event Of The Year || 
|-
|rowspan="6" | 1994 || Rhythm, Country and Blues || Album of the Year || 
|-
| Herself || Female Vocalist of the Year || 
|-
| Herself || Entertainer of the Year || 
|-
| "Does He Love You" || Music Video of the Year || 
|-
| "Does He Love You" || Vocal Event Of The Year || 
|-
| "Does He Love You" || Single of the Year || 
|-
|rowspan="2" | 1995 || "| Herself || Female Vocalist of the Year || 
|-
| Herself || Entertainer of the Year || 
|-
|rowspan="1" | 1996 || "On My Own" || Vocal Event Of The Year || 
|-
|rowspan="1" | 1998 || "If you see him/If you see her" || Vocal Event Of The Year || 
|-
| 2000 || Herself || International Artist Achievement Award || 
|-
| 2004 || Herself || Female Vocalist of the Year || 
|-
|rowspan="2" | 2007 || "| Herself || Female Vocalist of the Year || 
|-
| "Because of You" || Musical Event of the Year || 
|-
| 2008 || "Every Other Weekend" || Musical Event of the Year || 
|-
| 2009 || Herself || Female Vocalist of the Year || 
|-
| 2009 || "Cowgirls Don't Cry" (with Brooks & Dunn)|| Musical Event of the Year|| 
|-
| 2010 || Herself || Female Vocalist of the Year || 
|-
| 2011 || Herself || Country Music Hall of Fame Inductee || 
|-
| 2017 || Herself || Female Vocalist of the Year || 
|-
| 2020 || "Be A Light" (with Thomas Rhett, Hillary Scott, Chris Tomlin, Keith Urban)|| Musical Event of the Year||

French Country Music Awards
The French Association of Country Music holds annual awards to honor the best in country music. Reba McEntire has won one award.

|-
| 2008 || "Every Other Weekend" (with Kenny Chesney) || Best Duo Of The Year  || 
|-

Golden Globe Awards
The Golden Globe Awards are accolades bestowed by the 93 members of the Hollywood Foreign Press Association, recognizing excellence in film and television. Reba McEntire has been nominated once.

|-
| 2004 || Reba || Best Actress in a Television Series  Musical or Comedy ||

Grammy Awards
The Grammy Awards are presented annually by the National Academy of Recording Arts and Sciences of the United States for outstanding achievements in the music industry. The awards were established in 1958. Reba has won three Grammys and has been nominated 17 times.

|-
|1987
|"Whoever's in New England"
|rowspan="6"|Best Female Country Vocal Performance 
|
|-
|1988
|"The Last One to Know"
|
|-
|1989
|Reba
|
|-
|1991
|"You Lie" 
|
|-
|1992
|For My Broken Heart 
|
|-
|1993
|"The Greatest Man I Never Knew" 
|
|-
|rowspan="2"|1994
|"The Heart Won't Lie" 
|rowspan="2"|Best Country Collaboration with Vocals
|
|-
|"Does He Love You" 
|
|-
|rowspan="2"|1995
|Read My Mind 
|Best Country Album
|
|-
|"She Thinks His Name Was John" 
|Best Female Country Vocal Performance
|
|-
|1996
|"On My Own" 
|rowspan="2"|Best Country Collaboration with Vocals
|
|-
|1999
|"If You See Him/If You See Her" 
|
|-
|2001
|"What Do You Say (video)"
|Best Short Form Video
|
|-
|2008
|"Because of You" 
|Best Country Collaboration with Vocals
|
|-
|2018
|Sing It Now: Songs of Faith & Hope 
|Best Roots Gospel Album
|
|-
|2020
|Stronger Than the Truth 
|Best Country Album
|
|-
|2023
|"Does He Love You" (revisited) 
|Best Country Duo/Group Performance
|
|-

Kennedy Center Honors
The Kennedy Center Honors is an annual honor given to those in the performing arts for their lifetime of contributions to American culture. The honors have been presented annually since 1978, culminating each December in a star-studded gala celebrating the honorees in the Kennedy Center Opera House. Reba is the 8th of 8 Country Music artists to be honored so far.

!
|-
|2018
|Reba
|Kennedy Center Honors
|
|style="text-align:center;"|

People's Choice Awards
The People's Choice Awards are a venue for the American public to honor their favorite actors and actresses, musical performers, television shows, and motion pictures, and is voted on by the general public. Reba McEntire has won nine awards from thirteen nominations.

|-
| 1992 || rowspan="11"|Herself || Favorite Female Country Performer || 
|-
| 1992 || Favorite Female Musical Performer || 
|-
| 1993 || Favorite Female Musical Performer || 
|-
| 1993 || Favorite Female Country Performer || 
|-
| 1994 || Favorite Female Country Performer || 
|-
| 1994 || Favorite Female Musical Performer || 
|-
| 1995 || Favorite Female Country Performer || 
|-
| 1995 || Favorite Female Musical Performer || 
|-
| 1996 || Favorite Female Musical Performer || 
|-
| 1997 || Favorite Female Musical Performer || 
|-
| 1998 || Favorite Female Musical Performer || 
|-
| 2002 || Reba || Favorite Female Actress In A New Television Series  || 
|-
| 2016 || Herself || Favorite Female Country Artist || 
|-
| 2017 || Herself || Favorite Female Country Artist ||

Saturn Awards
The Saturn Awards are presented annually by the Academy of Science Fiction, Fantasy and Horror Films to honor science fiction, fantasy, and horror films and television. Reba McEntire has been nominated once.

|-
| 1991
| Tremors
| Best Supporting Actress
|

TNN/Music City Awards
The Nashville Network and the Music City News held an annual awards show from 1990 to 1999, winners were voted upon by general public. Reba McEntire won six awards.

|-
| 1991 || Herself || Female artist of the year || 
|-
| 1992 || Herself || Female artist of the year || 
|-
| 1993 || Herself || Female artist of the year || 
|-
| 1994 || "Does He Love You" (with Linda Davis) ||Vocal Collaboration of the year || 
|-
| 1995 || Herself || Female artist of the year || 
|-
| 1998 || Herself || Minnie Pearl Award || 
|-

TNN Viewer's Choice Awards
The Nashville Network held Viewer's Choice Awards in 1988 and 1989, the winners were voted on by the general public. Reba McEntire won two awards.

|-
| 1988
| Herself
| Favorite Female Vocalist
| 
|-
| 1989
| Herself
| Favorite Female Vocalist
|

Other awards and honors
1986 Grand Ole Opry, Inducted
1987 NARM, Top Selling Female Country Album - Whoever's In New England
1990 Saturn Awards, nominated for Best Supporting Actress for Tremors 
1994 Country Radio Awards, Entertainer of the Year
1994 Country Radio Awards, Female Vocalist
1996 Country Weekly Golden Pick Awards, Favorite Entertainer
1997 Country Weekly Golden Pick Awards, Favorite Female Vocalist
1998 Hollywood Walk of Fame, Inducted
1999 CMT International Awards, Video Event of the Year - "If You See Him/If You See Her"
2001 Drama Desk Awards, Special Award - Annie Get Your Gun
2001 Theater World Award, Annie Get Your Gun
2002 CMT 40 Greatest Women of Country Music, #6 ranking
2002  Cheyenne Frontier Days Hall of Fame
2003 Country Radio Broadcasters, Career Achievement Award
2004 New Music Weekly, Favorite Female Country Artist
2004 CMT Flameworthy Awards, Johnny Cash Visionary Award
2005 Family Television Awards, Best Actress, Reba
2006 CMT Giants, Inaugural Honoree
2006 Music City Walk of Fame, Inducted
2007 Billboard Magazine, Woman of the Year
2008 ASCAP, Golden Note Award
2009 Country Radio Association, Most Played Country Female Artist
2009 Country Radio Association, Most Top Ten Singles For Country Artist
2010 A Capitol Fourth National Artistic Achievement Award
2011 CMT's 20 Greatest Women, #1 ranking
2011 Country Music Hall of Fame, Inducted
2012 Hollywood Bowl Hall of Fame, Induction
2014 American Country Countdown Awards, Nash Icon Award
2015 Andrea Bocelli Foundation, Humanitarian Award
2018 Horatio Alger Award

References 

Mcentire, Reba